Sukhumi Bay (or залив Сухуми) is a bay in the Black Sea near Sukhumi, Abkhazia.

References

Bays of Abkhazia
Bays of the Black Sea